Simón Gaviria Muñoz (born 24 November 1980) is a Colombian economist and politician currently serving as Member of the Chamber of Representatives of Colombia since 2006. The son of the 28th President of Colombia, César Gaviria Trujillo, he is also the current National Director of the Colombian Liberal Party since 11 December 2011.

He was elected to the Chamber in 2006 in representation of the Bogotá circumscription as the second-in-line in the electoral list headed by David Luna Sánchez of the For the Country of our Dreams movement that received 103,795 in the 2006 legislative elections. In a 2007 survey of RCN TV, he was chosen as "Surprise Representative" for his rapid ascent in high politics and legislative actions, and in 2008 was chosen as "Best Chamber Representative" in another poll by RCN TV and Caracol Radio.

In the 2010 legislative elections, this time as a Liberal party candidate and head of the electoral list, he was re-elected with a total of 72,896, the largest margin of votes for any one Representative to the Chamber in 2010, and elected unanimously President of the Chamber of Representatives of Colombia for the legislative period 2011–2012 by the Liberal caucus in the chamber.

Personal life
Born on 24 November 1980 in Pereira, Colombia, he is the eldest of two children, son of César Gaviria Trujillo and Ana Milena Muñoz Gómez; his younger sister is María Paz Gaviria. He is married to María Margarita Amín Díaz with whom he has two daughters, Sofía and Filipa.

See also
 Enrique Peñalosa Londoño
 Juan Manuel Corzo Román

References

External links
 Chamber of Representatives of Colombia-Chamber Directory:Gaviria Muñoz Simón

1980 births
Living people
People from Pereira, Colombia
Children of presidents of Colombia
University of Pennsylvania alumni
Colombian economists
Colombian Liberal Party politicians
Members of the Chamber of Representatives of Colombia
Presidents of the Chamber of Representatives of Colombia